Girish Gangadharan  (born 08 th March 1985) is an Indian cinematographer known for his work in Malayalam and Tamil films. He is the recipient of National Film Award for Best Cinematography for his work in the 2019 film Jallikkattu directed by Lijo Jose Pellissery.

Career
Girish completed his cinematography course from the Government Film and Television Institute, Bengaluru in 2008. Post-graduation, he started assisting Sameer Thahir. His debut as an independent cinematographer was in Sameer Thahir's directorial debut in 2013, Neelakasham Pachakadal Chuvanna Bhoomi. Following his debut, some of his most notable works include Guppy (2016), Angamaly Diaries (2017), Swathanthryam Ardharathriyil (2018), and Jallikattu (2019). He rose to national fame after the 11 minute single long take in the climax of Angamaly Diaries. In the same manner, he also captured long takes in Jallikattu also. In 2016, he won the Kerala State Film Award – Special Mention for Guppy. In 2021, he won the National Film Award for Best Cinematography for Jallikattu.

Filmography

References

External links

Living people
Malayalam film cinematographers
Cinematographers from Kerala
People from Kollam district
Best Cinematography National Film Award winners
1985 births